Sarkhai Beyglu (also Romanized as Sarkhāī Beyglū) is a village in Aslan Duz Rural District, Aslan Duz District, Parsabad County, Ardabil Province, Iran. At the 2006 census, its population was 361, in 73 families.

References 

Towns and villages in Parsabad County